The 1964 Women's South American Volleyball Championship was the 6th edition of the Women's South American Volleyball Championship, organised by South America's governing volleyball body, the Confederación Sudamericana de Voleibol (CSV). It was held in Buenos Aires, Argentina, from 30 March to 8 April.

Notes 
Due to a political turmoil in Brazil, the Brazil national team did not participate in this tournament, this is the only edition of the competition so far not featuring the Green and Golds in the final.

Final standing

References

External links 
 todor66.com

Women's South American Volleyball Championships
South American Volleyball Championships
Volleyball
1964 Volleyball
1964 in South American sport
International volleyball competitions hosted by Argentina
 30-31
 01-08